Pseudatteria cladodes is a species of moth of the family Tortricidae. It is found in Peru, Colombia and possibly Central America.

References

Moths described in 1914
Pseudatteria